Try a Little Love is the second posthumous studio album by American singer-songwriter Sam Cooke. Sammy Davis Jr. composed the liner notes.

Track listing

Side one
 "Try a Little Love" (J.W. Alexander, Sam Cooke)	
 "Don't Cry on My Shoulder" (Pat Kennedy, Turk Prujan)
 "Bridge of Tears" (J.W. Alexander)
 "I Fall in Love Every Day" (Jimmy Clark)
 "You're Always on My Mind" (James W. Alexander)
 "Almost in Your Arms"	(Jay Livingston, Ray Evans, Sam Cooke)

Side two
 "When a Boy Falls in Love" (Clinton Levert, Sam Cooke)
 "To Each His Own" (Jay Livingston, Ray Evans)
 "Tammy" (Jay Livingston, Ray Evans)	
 "The Gypsy" (Billy Reid)
 "The Little Things You Do" (J.W. Alexander)
 "You Send Me" (L.C. Cook)

Notes 

 Tracks 1-3, 7 & 8 are unreleased.
 Track 4 was the B-side to "Chain Gang" in 1960.
 Track 5 is from My Kind of Blues (1961).
 Track 6 was the B-side to "Win Your Love for Me" in 1958.
 Tracks 9 & 12 are from Sam Cooke (1958).
 Track 10 is from Encore (1958).
 Track 11 was the B-side to "Everybody Loves to Cha-Cha-Cha" in 1959.

Personnel
René Hall, Sammy Lowe – arrangers
Billy Mure, René Hall, Sammy Lowe – conductors

Charts

Notes

External links 
 Songs of Sam Cooke: Main Page

1965 albums
Sam Cooke albums
Albums arranged by René Hall
Albums conducted by René Hall
Albums conducted by Sammy Lowe
Albums produced by Hugo & Luigi
Albums published posthumously
RCA Victor albums